Gypsy Sweetheart is a 1935 Vitaphone short comedy film released by Warner Brothers on March 30, 1935 that was part of the studio's Broadway Brevities series for the season 1934–1935. It was filmed in full color (three-strip Technicolor). This film featured Wini Shaw as a singer with a group of gypsies who take over a garden party with singing, dancing and general merriment.

References

American comedy short films
1935 comedy films
1935 films
1930s American films